Thoracic dysplasia-hydrocephalus syndrome is a rare autosomal recessive genetic disorder characterized by shortening of the ribs, narrowing of the chest, mild shortening of the limbs (rhizomelia), hydrocephalus, and variable developmental delays. It has been described in two siblings born to consanguineous Pakistani parents.

References 

Syndromes